Miriam Fatime Sylla (born 8 January 1995) is Italian volleyball player of Ivorian descent, playing as a wing spiker or opposite. She is part of the Italy women's national volleyball team. She competed at the 2015 European Games in Baku, the 2015 FIVB Volleyball World Grand Prix, the 2017 FIVB Volleyball World Grand Prix, and the 2018 FIVB Volleyball Women's Nations League.

Club career
On club level she played for Foppapedretti Bergamo in 2015–2017. From 2018 to 2022 she then played for Imoco Volley. In 2022 she has become a player of Vero Volley Milano.

Personal life
She was born in Palermo from Ivorian parents. Then they left to the province of Lecco.

Awards

Individuals
 2018 FIVB World Championship "Best Outside Spiker"
 2019 European Championship "Best Outside Spiker"
 2021 European Championship "Best Outside Spiker"
 2022 FIVB World Championship "Best Outside Spiker"

Clubs
 2015-16 Italian Cup (Coppa Italia) -  Champions, with Imoco Volley Conegliano
 2018 Italian Supercup -  Champions, with Imoco Volley Conegliano
 2018–19 Italian League -  Champion, with Imoco Volley Conegliano
 2018–19 CEV Champions League -  Runner-Up, with Imoco Volley Conegliano
 2019 Italian Supercup -  Champions, with Imoco Volley Conegliano
 2019 FIVB Volleyball Women's Club World Championship -  Champion, with Imoco Volley Conegliano
 2019-20 Italian Cup (Coppa Italia) -  Champion, with Imoco Volley Conegliano
 2020 Italian Supercup -  Champions, with Imoco Volley Conegliano
 2020-21 Italian Cup (Coppa Italia) -  Champion, with Imoco Volley Conegliano
 2020–21 Italian League -  Champion, with Imoco Volley Conegliano
 2020–21 CEV Women's Champions League -  Champion, with Imoco Volley Conegliano
 2021 Italian Supercup -  Champions, with Imoco Volley Conegliano
 2021-22 Italian Cup (Coppa Italia) -  Champion, with Imoco Volley Conegliano
 2021–22 Italian League -  Champion, with Imoco Volley Conegliano

References

1995 births
Living people
Italian women's volleyball players
Place of birth missing (living people)
European Games competitors for Italy
Volleyball players at the 2015 European Games
Volleyball players at the 2016 Summer Olympics
Olympic volleyball players of Italy
Italian people of Ivorian descent
Italian sportspeople of African descent
Volleyball players at the 2020 Summer Olympics
Sportspeople from Palermo